Thomas Underwood Groube (2 September 1857 – 5 August 1927) was an Australian cricketer who played in one Test in 1880. He was the first New Zealand-born Test cricketer.

Life and career
Groube's father was Horatio Groube, a Congregational minister who was among the first white settlers in New Plymouth, where Tom was born. The family left New Zealand in the early 1860s as a result of the Second Taranaki War and settled in Melbourne. Tom's paternal grandfather was a rear-admiral in the Royal Navy.

Five feet eleven inches tall and slimly built, Tom Groube was a successful batsman in Melbourne club cricket in the late 1870s and early 1880s. Between 1878 and 1885 he scored 2350 runs for the East Melbourne club at an average of 44. He played four matches of first-class cricket for Victoria between 1879 and 1881 but with little success. In 1878-79 he averaged 155.33 for East Melbourne, which helped him earn a place in the Australian team to England in 1880. He was a late replacement for Charles Bannerman, who had to withdraw from the selected touring team owing to illness.

Groube's highest first-class score was 61 against Yorkshire in 1880, which was the only time he reached 20 in first-class cricket. He played in the Test at The Oval in 1880, the first-ever Test match in England, but was not successful. He later toured New Zealand with the Australian team in 1880-81, his highest score there being 42 against Canterbury.

In later years Groube wrote about cricket and Australian rules football in Victoria for the Weekly Times and The Herald under the pen-names "Old Cricketer" and "Rover". He conducted the choir at the Congregational church in Hawthorn, Melbourne, for about 40 years. He was survived by his wife and their three sons.

See also
 List of Victoria first-class cricketers

References

External links
 
 

1857 births
1927 deaths
Australia Test cricketers
Victoria cricketers
Cricketers from New Plymouth
Australian cricketers
New Zealand emigrants to Australia